Ibo van de Poel is Antoni van Leeuwenhoek Professor in Ethics and Technology at Delft University of Technology.

Academic contributions 
According to Google Scholar, Van de Poel's work has been cited over 3700 times and currently holds an h-index of 35. Additionally, he is the author of the first Dutch textbook on ethics and technology.

Books 

 Van de Poel, Ibo, Donna C. Mehos, and Lotte Asveld, eds. (2018). New Perspectives on Technology in Society: Experimentation Beyond the Laboratory. Oxon and New York: Routledge. 
 Van de Poel, Ibo, Lamber Royakkers, and Sjoerd D. Zwart. 2015. Moral Responsibility and the Problem of Many Hands: Routledge. 
 van den Hoven, Jeroen, Pieter E. Vermaas, and Ibo Van de Poel, eds. 2015. Handbook of ethics and values in technological design. Sources, Theory, Values and Application Domains: Springer. 
 Doorn, Neelke, Daan Schuurbiers, Ibo van de Poel, and Michael E.  Gorman, eds. 2013. Early engagement and new technologies: Opening up the laboratory. Dordrecht: Springer. 
 Van de Poel, Ibo, and Lambèr Royakkers. 2011. Ethics, technology and engineering. Oxford: Wiley-Blackwell. 
 Vermaas, Pieter, Peter Kroes, Ibo van de Poel, Maarten Franssen, and Wybo Houkes. 2011. A Philosophy of Technology: From Technical Artefacts to Sociotechnical Systems. Vol. 6, Synthesis Lectures on Engineers, Technology and Society. 
 Vincent, Nicole, Ibo Van de Poel, and Jeroen Van den Hoven, eds. 2011. Moral Responsibility. Beyond free will and determinism. Dordrecht: Springer. 
 Van de Poel, Ibo, and David E. Goldberg, eds. 2010. Philosophy and engineering. An emerging agenda. Dordrecht: Springer.

Selected publications 

 
 Van de Poel, Ibo, and Martin Sand. 2018. "Varieties of responsibility: two problems of responsible innovation."  Synthese. doi.org/10.1007/s11229-018-01951-7
 Van de Poel, Ibo. 2018. "Design for value change."  Ethics and Information Technology. doi.org/10.1007/s10676-018-9461-9
 Van de Poel, Ibo. 2016. "An Ethical Framework for Evaluating Experimental Technology."  Science and Engineering Ethics 22 (3):667-686. doi.org/10.1007/s11948-015-9724-3
 Van de Poel, Ibo. 2015. "Morally experimenting with nuclear energy." In The Ethics of Nuclear Energy: Risk, Justice and Democracy in the post-Fukushima Era, edited by Behnam Taebi and Sabine Roeser, 179-199. Cambridge: Cambridge University Press. 
 Van de Poel, Ibo. 2013. "Translating values into design requirements." In Philosophy and Engineering: Reflections on Practice, Principles and Process, edited by D. Mitchfelder, N. McCarty and D.E. Goldberg, 253-266. Dordrecht: Springer. 
 Van de Poel, Ibo, Jessica Nihlén Fahlquist, Neelke Doorn, Sjoerd Zwart, and Lambèr Royakkers. 2012. "The Problem of Many Hands: Climate Change as an Example."  Science and Engineering Ethics 18 (1):49-68. 10.1007/s11948-011-9276-0
 Van de Poel, Ibo, and Jessica Nihlen-Fahlquist. 2012. "Risk and responsibility." In Handbook of Risk Theory, edited by Sabine Roeser, Rafaela Hillerbrand, Martin Peterson and Per Sandin, 877-907. Dordrecht: Springer.
 Van de Poel, Ibo, and Sjoerd D. Zwart. 2010. "Reflective Equilibrium in R&D Networks."  Science, Technology, & Human Values 35 (2):174-199. doi.org/10.1177/0162243909340272

References 

Living people
Academic staff of the Delft University of Technology
Year of birth missing (living people)
Philosophy of engineering
Philosophers of technology